Orthaga meyricki is a species of snout moth in the genus Orthaga. It is found on the Philippines.

References

Moths described in 1931
Epipaschiinae
Endemic fauna of the Philippines